Marcianise is a town and comune in the province of Caserta, Campania, southern Italy.

History
In the area of the commune of Marcianise numerous tombs of Etruscan and Roman age have been excavated, although Oscan elements should have pre-existed. The origin of the today's city are uncertain. It was allegedly founded in the 6th century CE by bands of Ostrogoths after their defeat in the Gothic War.

In 861 it was probably destroyed by the Saracens along with Capua. After the creation of the Duchy of Capua, Marcianise followed the latter's history.

The area was repeatedly struck by cholera but, according to a legend, the city was miraculously spared by the July 1706 plague through the intercession of the Holy Crucifix. Later the marshy area was dried, and extensive cultivation of cannabis augmented the economy of the region.

Main sights
The Baroque church of the Annunziata. The interior has Neapolitan school frescoes.
The Cathedral of St. Michael Archangel houses an allegedly miraculous crucifix which, according to the legend, saved the city from cholera in the 18th century.
The Castle of Loriano (15th century) has maintained the towers, the walls and the interior church, while that in Ariola is now a private residence.

Near Marcianise, was the mediumwave transmitter for the Naples area, which worked on 657 kHz.
This antenna was recently removed.

Dialect
The dialect of Marcianise, although similar to Neapolitan, shows a long series of peculiar influences ranging from French and English to more ancient Greek and Oscan. Examples of local exclusive words include ching for "tile" (Italian: tegola) and cstunia for "turtle" (Italian: tartaruga).

Economy
Marcianise is home to several craftsmanship firms working  gold and coral, as well as numerous chemical, manufacture and chemical industries. Together with the territories of Maddaloni, Acerra, Caivano and Teverola, the commune forms the second most industrialized area of Italy. Dairy and wine production is also flourishing.

Transportation
Marcianise has a station on the Caserta-Aversa-Naples railroad.

During World War II there was an airfield nearby used by the Royal Air Force:
 No. 13 Squadron RAF
 No. 18 Squadron RAF
 No. 55 Squadron RAF
 No. 92 Squadron RAF
 No. 114 Squadron RAF
 No. 145 Squadron RAF
 No. 417 Squadron RAF
 No. 600 Squadron RAF
 No. 601 Squadron RAF
 Air Headquarters Italy Communication Squadron RAF

References

Citations

Bibliography

Cities and towns in Campania